Kishanpole is one of the 200 Legislative Assembly constituencies of Rajasthan state in India. It is in Jaipur district and is a segment of Jaipur Lok Sabha seat.

Members of Assembly

Election results

1962 Assembly Election
 Bheron Singh (JS) : 19,188 votes    
 Mahendra Singh (SWA) : 12,487

2018 Assembly Election

See also 
 List of constituencies of Rajasthan Legislative Assembly
Jaipur district

References 

Assembly constituencies of Rajasthan